The Perth Youth Theatre is a holiday school for kids in  Perth, Western Australia. They have put on performances at many different theatres in Perth

Musicals
A class teaching Musical Theatre Skills with performances such as:
Joseph and the Amazing Technicolor Dreamcoat
Grease
Chicago
Horror - A mix of different horror items
Harry Potter and the Philosopher's Stone

Dance
A class for experienced dancers performing:
A Chorus Line
Cats

Drama
A class with no singing or dancing.
Things that go Bump in the Night
Bugsy Malone

Mini Kids
A class for those between 2 and 9 years old mainly performing mega mix dance routines.
Grease Megamix
Horror Megamix

External links
 https://web.archive.org/web/20070927003855/http://www.theatre.asn.au/node/11522

Amateur theatre companies in Australia
Youth theatre companies